UFC Fight Night: Silva vs. Bisping (also known as UFC Fight Night 84) was a mixed martial arts event held on 27 February 2016 at The O2 Arena in London, England.

Background
The event was the eighth that the promotion hosted in London and the fifth held at The O2 Arena.

Michael Bisping was originally expected to face Gegard Mousasi at this event in a non-headliner middleweight bout. However, on 24 December, Mousasi was replaced by former UFC Middleweight Champion Anderson Silva in favour of a main event. Three days later, it was announced that Mousasi would face former title challenger Thales Leites.

Jimi Manuwa was expected to face Nikita Krylov at this event. However, on 31 December, Manuwa pulled out of the bout due to an undisclosed injury and the fight was scrapped.

Henry Briones was expected to face Brad Pickett at the event. However, Briones pulled out of the bout on 22 January and was replaced by Francisco Rivera.

Łukasz Sajewski was expected to face Teemu Packalén at the event. However 16 February, Sajewski pulled out due to an injury and was replaced by promotional newcomer Thibault Gouti.

The event tied UFC 169 and UFC Fight Night: Machida vs. Mousasi for the most decisions at a single UFC event with 10.

Results

Bonus awards
The following fighters were awarded $50,000 bonuses:
Fight of the Night: Michael Bisping vs. Anderson Silva
Performance of the Night: Scott Askham and Teemu Packalén

See also
List of UFC events
2016 in UFC

References

UFC Fight Night
2016 in mixed martial arts
2016 sports events in London
Events in London
Mixed martial arts in the United Kingdom
Sport in London
February 2016 sports events in the United Kingdom